Auratonota ovulus is a species of moth of the family Tortricidae. It is found in Ecuador.

The wingspan is about 19 mm. The ground colour of the forewings is whitish, preserved along the edges of the markings and in the form of an oval white blotch. The rest of the forewing is suffused with pale ferruginous brown. The markings are rust brown. The hindwings are brownish, but pale basally.

Etymology
The specific name refers to the shape of the pale spot on the forewing and is derived from Latin ovulus (meaning small egg).

References

Moths described in 2008
Auratonota
Moths of South America